Hypnose: Sklaven fremden Willens is a 1920 German silent film directed by Richard Eichberg. It was the first German production actor Bela Lugosi made in Germany, following Bruno Declari leaving Eichberg-Film to form his own production company.

Hypnose: Sklaven fremden Willens premiered at Schauburg-Lichtspiele in Berlin on January 3, 1920. Two weeks following its premiere, the film's title was cut down to just Sklaven fremden Willens due to the similarity of the film titled Hypnose starring Austrian mentalist and clairvoyant Erik Jan Hanussen

Cast

Production
Actor Bela Lugosi arrived in Berling in September 1919. According to Lugosi biographer Gary D. Rhodes and Bill Kaffenberger, Lugosi transitioned into the German film industry with ease as he had lived in the Hungarian and German side of his homeotwn Lugos. Several of Lugosi's Hungarian films were shown in Germany previously as well, including Az Ezredes (1918) and Az élet királya (1918).

Director Richard Eichberg who headed Eichberg-Film created films with actor Bruno Declari. As Declari had created his own film company in mid-1919, Eichberg required a new star. In the 1920 German publication Film Magazin, Lugosi's brief biography states that Declari leaving opened the door to Lugosi. Lugosi's first film for Eichberg was Hypnose: Sklaven fremden Willens.

Release and reception
Hypnose: Sklaven fremden Willens premiered at Schauburg-Lichtspiele in Berlin on January 3, 1920.
A review in Film-Kurier, a critic stated the film is "totally suspenseful and reflects the most outstanding film technology using all the means at its disposal." while "it would be helped by applying the 'editor's scissors,' reducing the 6 acts to just 5." The review went on to praise Lee Parry who "performs exquisitely and her dress is refined in taste" and Lugosi who "is a welcome newcomer - he possess decided talent, but must guard against exaggeration."

Within two weeks of the films premiere, the film's title was changed to just Sklaven fremden Willens due to the similarity of the film titled Hypnose starring Austrian mentalist and clairvoyant Erik Jan Hanussen.

See also
 Béla Lugosi filmography

References

Sources

External links

1920 films
Films of the Weimar Republic
German black-and-white films
German silent feature films
Films directed by Richard Eichberg